Coleophora intensa is a moth of the family Coleophoridae. It is found in South Africa.

References

Endemic moths of South Africa
intensa
Moths described in 1913
Moths of Africa